The 2014–15 Australian Women's Twenty20 Cup was the sixth and last formal season of the Australian Women's Twenty20 Cup, which was the premier domestic women's Twenty20 cricket competition in Australia prior to the inception of the Women's Big Bash League in 2015. The tournament started on 10 October 2014 and finished on 28 January 2015. The defending champions were Queensland Fire, who finished third. New South Wales Breakers won the tournament for the second time after finishing first in the group stage and beating Victorian Spirit in the final.

Ladder

Fixtures

Final

Statistics

Highest totals

Most runs

Most wickets

References

External links
 Series home at ESPNcricinfo

 
Australian Women's Twenty20 Cup seasons
 
Australian Women's Twenty20 Cup